Andrew Greene (born October 30, 1982) is an American former professional ice hockey defenseman who played sixteen seasons in the National Hockey League (NHL), primarily for the New Jersey Devils, with whom he served as team captain.

Playing career

College
Greene attended and played hockey at Miami University for the RedHawks men's ice hockey team. He was signed as an undrafted NHL free agent by the New Jersey Devils in 2006 and was assigned to the team's American Hockey League (AHL) affiliate, Lowell Devils, after New Jersey's training camp. He excelled at the AHL level, making the PlanetUSA All-Star Team.

New Jersey Devils

During his rookie professional season in 2006–07, Greene was called-up to the NHL for a short stint to replace the injured Johnny Oduya. Though Greene played well and showed considerable promise, he was reassigned to Lowell upon Oduya's return. Later in the season, he was again recalled when Colin White was injured. When the 2007 Stanley Cup playoffs began, the NHL salary cap no longer applied, allowing the Devils to add Greene to their permanent roster. With the return of injured defenseman Richard Matvichuk, it appeared as though Greene would sit. However, an injury to Colin White allowed Greene to remain on the roster. During this period, Greene played so well that, upon White's return, Oduya was scratched instead of Greene.

On July 1, 2011, Greene signed a new four-year, $14 million contract with the Devils.

On July 30, 2014, Greene signed a new five-year, $25 million contract with the Devils.

Before the start of the 2015–16 season, Greene was named the Devils' captain, following the retirement of incumbent captain Bryce Salvador.

The following season, Greene injured his hand in a game against the Carolina Hurricanes, resulting in him losing his streak of 350 consecutive NHL games played. His streak was the third-longest in Devils history, behind those of Travis Zajac and Ken Daneyko. At the conclusion of the season, Greene was the Devils' nominee for the Bill Masterton Memorial Trophy, awarded annually to the NHL player who best shows perseverance, sportsmanship and dedication to hockey.

New York Islanders and retirement
The move came following 14 seasons with the club. The trade reunited Greene with Islanders general manager Lou Lamoriello, who was general manager of the Devils in 2006 when Greene signed with the club. Greene scored his first playoff goal in 10 years during the Islanders' second round series against the Philadelphia Flyers. His previous playoff goal was in 2010, also against the Flyers.

On January 11, 2021, Greene was signed to a reported one-year, $700,000 extension with the Islanders.

On November 16, 2021, Greene played his 1000th NHL game.

After going unsigned in the 2022–23 offseason, Greene announced his retirement on October 12, 2022, signing a one-day contract to retire with the Devils.

Personal life
Greene has three older brothers, David, Matt, and Shawn, all of whom played hockey. Greene was born prematurely on the way to his brother's hockey game.

Greene and his wife Rachel have two sons, Colton and Maddox. During the off-season, Greene returns to his hometown and organizes a hockey skills school called Andy Greene Hockey School.

Greene's former high school, Trenton High School, officially retired his number in 2012.

Greene holds a degree in education from Miami University.  In 2019, he was inducted into the Miami Athletics Hall of Fame.

Career statistics

Regular season and playoffs

International

Awards and honors

References

External links
 

1982 births
Living people
American men's ice hockey defensemen
Ice hockey players from Michigan
Lowell Devils players
Miami RedHawks men's ice hockey players
New Jersey Devils players
New York Islanders players
People from Trenton, Michigan
Undrafted National Hockey League players
AHCA Division I men's ice hockey All-Americans